is a Japanese diver. He competed in the men's 10 metre platform event at the 1984 Summer Olympics.

References

1962 births
Living people
Japanese male divers
Olympic divers of Japan
Divers at the 1984 Summer Olympics
Place of birth missing (living people)
Asian Games medalists in diving
Divers at the 1982 Asian Games
Asian Games bronze medalists for Japan
Medalists at the 1982 Asian Games
20th-century Japanese people